Pickrelltown is an unincorporated community in Logan County, Ohio.

The settlement is located at the intersection of County Roads 28 and 29 in northern Monroe Township.
It is known for its monument in the middle of the intersection of the town, often thought to be a round-a-bout.

Variant names of Pickrelltown include "Frogtown", "Pickereltown", "Pickeretown", and "Pickreltown".

History
A post office was established at Pickrelltown in 1851, and remained in operation until 1903. The community was named for Henry Pickerel, the proprietor of a local tanyard.

Geography
Pickrelltown is a short distance south of Mad River Mountain Ski Resort and southeast of Bellefontaine.  The headwaters of the Macochee Creek, a small stream that meets the Mad River at West Liberty, are located around Pickrelltown.

Pigeon Town, a town of the Shawnee Mekoche division, was located on Mad River, 3 miles northwest of West Liberty, Logan County, Ohio.

Notable people
Solomon L. Hoge — South Carolina Supreme Court justice and U.S. representative from South Carolina

Gallery

References

External links
Detailed Logan County map

Unincorporated communities in Ohio
Unincorporated communities in Logan County, Ohio
1851 establishments in Ohio
Populated places established in 1851